Nicholas Raymond Bierbrodt (born May 16, 1978) is an American former professional baseball pitcher. He spent four seasons from 2001 to 2004 in Major League Baseball (MLB) with the Arizona Diamondbacks, Tampa Bay Devil Rays, Cleveland Indians and Texas Rangers.

Career 
He was a first round pick for the Arizona Diamondbacks in the 1996 MLB draft, becoming the first player ever drafted by the franchise. He had compiled a minor league record of 28-28 from 1996 to 2001, when in 2001 he was promoted to the Major League team and added to the Diamondbacks rotation. He made 5 starts for the Diamondbacks before being traded to the Tampa Bay Devil Rays for Albie Lopez and Mike DiFelice. Between Arizona and Tampa Bay, Bierbrodt finished with a record of 5–6 with a 5.55 ERA in 16 starts.

Bierbrodt was shot three times in the arm and chest in a taxi cab in Charleston, South Carolina in June 2002. He missed the entire 2002 season while recovering.

In 2003, Bierbrodt made the Opening Day roster. His return to the Majors was short lived, as in 13 games for the Devil Rays, he had a 9.14 ERA and was later claimed off waivers by the Cleveland Indians In 2004, he signed as a free agent with the Texas Rangers, appearing in 4 starts for them that year.

In 2005, Bierbrodt signed with the Somerset Patriots, an independent league team. He would remain with the Patriots for two years before signing with the Bridgeport Bluefish.

In 2010, Bierbrodt signed a minor league deal with the Colorado Rockies.
In 2011, the Baltimore Orioles signed Bierbrodt to a minor league deal. He spent 2011 in the Orioles farm system before retiring.

References

External links

1978 births
Living people
American expatriate baseball players in Taiwan
Arizona Diamondbacks players
Arizona League Diamondbacks players
Baseball players from California
Bowie Baysox players
Brother Elephants players
Bridgeport Bluefish players
Buffalo Bisons (minor league) players
Charleston RiverDogs players
Cleveland Indians players
Colorado Springs Sky Sox players
El Paso Diablos players
Frisco RoughRiders players
High Desert Mavericks players
Lethbridge Black Diamonds players
Long Beach Armada players
Major League Baseball pitchers
Norfolk Tides players
Oklahoma RedHawks players
People from Tarzana, Los Angeles
Baseball players from Atlanta
Somerset Patriots players
South Bend Silver Hawks players
Tampa Bay Devil Rays players
Texas Rangers players
Tucson Sidewinders players
Tulsa Drillers players
American shooting survivors
Algodoneros de Guasave players
American expatriate baseball players in Mexico
Millikan High School alumni